Marvin Oliver may refer to:
 Marvin Oliver (artist)
 Marvin Oliver (footballer)